Vasily Alexandrovich Podkolzin (alternately spelled Vasili Podkolzin, ; born 24 June 2001) is a Russian professional ice hockey winger currently playing for the  Vancouver Canucks of the National Hockey League (NHL). He was selected tenth overall by the Canucks in the 2019 NHL Entry Draft and made his NHL debut with them in 2021. Prior to joining Vancouver Podkolzin played for SKA Saint Petersburg of the Kontinental Hockey League. Internationally Podkolzin has played for the Russian national junior team at several tournaments.

Playing career
Podkolzin played for the Belye Medvedi club until he was 12 years old, when he moved to Vityaz Podolsk. The move was done both because Belye Medvedi has no professional affiliate, and their leadership had changed. He spent four years with Vityaz at their school, but was not given a chance to play for their club in the Junior Hockey League (MHL), the top junior league in Russia, so in 2018 he decided to transfer to powerhouse SKA Saint Petersburg.

On 12 November 2018, Podkolzin made his Kontinental Hockey League (KHL) debut with SKA Saint Petersburg, becoming the first player born in the 21st century to play in the KHL. He split the 2018–19 season between three teams and leagues: three games with SKA; fourteen with SKA-Neva of the Supreme Hockey League (VHL), the minor league for the KHL; and twelve games with SKA-1946 of the MHL.

Rated by the NHL Central Scouting Bureau as the second-best international (playing outside of North America) skater, Podkolzin was a highly regarded prospect going into the 2019 NHL Entry Draft. He was selected tenth overall by the Vancouver Canucks. As he still had a contract with SKA for two more seasons, Podkolzin remained in Russia before moving to the NHL.

On 30 May 2021, Podkolzin was signed by the Vancouver Canucks to a three-year, entry-level contract. He scored his first NHL goal against the Philadelphia Flyers' Carter Hart on 15 October in his second NHL game.

International play

 

 
 

In 2018, Podkolzin captained Russia in the Hlinka Gretzky Cup where he won a bronze medal. In the bronze medal game against the United States, Podkolzin scored a hat trick in a 5–4 victory. He led the tournament in scoring with 8 goals, 3 assists and 11 total points in 5 games.

Podkolzin next played internationally at the 2019 World Junior Championships in Vancouver, Canada. He recorded 3 assists in 7 games, helping Russia win bronze. He also played at the 2019 Under-18 World Championships, scoring four points in seven games. Podkolzin then played in the 2020 World Junior Championships in Ostrava. He scored five points in seven games, registering a goal and 4 assists. Russia fell in the final to Canada, leaving with a silver medal. In 2021, he was named captain of Team Russia, where he led the team to a 4th place finish. He scored four points in seven games with two goals and two assists.

Personal life
Podkolzin was born in Moscow and grew up in the Maryino District of the city. He has one younger brother, Mikhail (born 2011), who also plays hockey. Podkolzin's father, Alexander, is an entrepreneur, while his mother teaches piano. He first skated at the age of four, and began to play hockey shortly after that. His grandfather played for Khimik Voskresensk, and his father plays in an amateur league. When he was eight, Podkolzin joined the Belye Medvedi (White Bears) club. The Belye Medvedi facilities were on the opposite side of the city from the Podkolzin home (north-west and south-east, respectively); it took over an hour via metro and bus for Podkolzin to reach the rink. When he moved to Saint Petersburg, Podkolzin stayed in an apartment with a teammate, Ivan Manin.

Career statistics

Regular season and playoffs

International

References

External links
 

2001 births
Living people
Abbotsford Canucks players
National Hockey League first-round draft picks
Russian ice hockey right wingers
SKA-1946 players
SKA-Neva players
SKA Saint Petersburg players
Ice hockey people from Moscow
Vancouver Canucks draft picks
Vancouver Canucks players